The 1996 NCAA Division I baseball season, play of college baseball in the United States organized by the National Collegiate Athletic Association (NCAA) began in the spring of 1996.  The season progressed through the regular season and concluded with the 1996 College World Series.  The College World Series, held for the fiftieth time in 1996, consisted of one team from each of eight regional competitions and was held in Omaha, Nebraska, at Johnny Rosenblatt Stadium as a double-elimination tournament.  LSU claimed the championship for the third time.

Realignment
The Metro Conference dissolved, with its members moving primarily to Conference USA.
Notre Dame departed the Midwestern Collegiate Conference for the Big East Conference, while Xavier and La Salle moved to the Atlantic 10 Conference.
Fordham and Virginia Tech also joined the Atlantic 10, from the Patriot League and the Metro Conference, respectively.
VCU joined the Colonial Athletic Association from the Metro Conference.
Stephen F. Austin dissolved their baseball program.  It would not resume until the 2006 season.

Format changes
The Trans America Athletic Conference divided into three divisions of four teams each, the Eastern, Southern, and Western.
The Big East divided into two divisions, named National and American.
The Southland Conference divided into two divisions of four teams each, named Louisiana and Texas.

Conference winners
This is a partial list of conference champions from the 1996 season.  The NCAA sponsored regional competitions to determine the College World Series participants.  Each of the eight regionals consisted of six teams competing in double-elimination tournaments, with the winners advancing to Omaha.  In order to provide all conference champions with an automatic bid, 12 conference champions participated in a play-in round.  The six winners joined the other 18 conference champions with automatic bids, 24 teams earned at-large selections.

Conference standings
The following is an incomplete list of conference standings:

College World Series

The 1996 season marked the fiftieth NCAA Baseball Tournament, which culminated with the eight team College World Series.  The College World Series was held in Omaha, Nebraska.  The eight teams played a double-elimination format, with LSU claiming their third championship with a 9–8 win over Miami (FL) in the final.

Bracket

Award winners

All-America team

References